Dice (singular die or dice) are small, throwable objects with marked sides that can rest in multiple positions. They are used for generating random values, commonly as part of tabletop games, including dice games, board games, role-playing games, and games of chance.

A traditional die is a cube with each of its six faces marked with a different number of dots (pips) from one to six. When thrown or rolled, the die comes to rest showing a random integer from one to six on its upper surface, with each value being equally likely. Dice may also have polyhedral or irregular shapes, may have faces marked with numerals or symbols instead of pips and may have their numbers carved out from the material of the dice instead of marked on it. Loaded dice are designed to favor some results over others for cheating or entertainment.

History

Dice have been used since before recorded history, and it is uncertain where they originated. It is theorized that dice developed from the practice of fortune-telling with the talus of hoofed animals, colloquially known as knucklebones. The Egyptian game of senet (played before 3000 BCE and up to the 2nd century CE) was played with flat two-sided throwsticks which indicated the number of squares a player could move, and thus functioned as a form of dice. Perhaps the oldest known dice were excavated as part of a backgammon-like game set at the Burnt City, an archeological site in south-eastern Iran, estimated to be from between 2800 and 2500 BCE. Bone dice from Skara Brae, Scotland have been dated to 3100–2400 BCE. Excavations from graves at Mohenjo-daro, an Indus Valley civilization settlement, unearthed terracotta dice dating to 2500–1900 BCE, including at least one die whose opposite sides all add up to seven, as in modern dice.

Games involving dice are mentioned in the ancient Indian Rigveda, Atharvaveda, Mahabharata and Buddhist games list. There are several biblical references to "casting lots" ( yappîlū ḡōrāl), as in Psalm 22, indicating that dicing (or a related activity) was commonplace when the psalm was composed. Knucklebones was a game of skill played in ancient Greece; a derivative form had the four sides of bones receive different values like modern dice.

Although gambling was illegal, many Romans were passionate gamblers who enjoyed dicing, which was known as aleam ludere ("to play at dice"). There were two sizes of Roman dice. Tali were large dice inscribed with one, three, four, and six on four sides. Tesserae were smaller dice with sides numbered from one to six. Twenty-sided dice date back to the 2nd century CE and from Ptolemaic Egypt as early as the 2nd century BCE.

Dominoes and playing cards originated in China as developments from dice. The transition from dice to playing cards occurred in China around the Tang dynasty (618–907 CE), and coincides with the technological transition from rolls of manuscripts to block printed books. In Japan, dice were used to play a popular game called sugoroku. There are two types of sugoroku. Ban-sugoroku is similar to backgammon and dates to the Heian period (794–1185 CE), while e-sugoroku is a racing game.

Use
Dice are thrown onto a surface either from the hand or from a container designed for this (such as a cup or tray). The face (or corner, in cases such as tetrahedral dice, or edge, for odd-numbered barrel dice) of the die that is uppermost when it comes to rest provides the value of the throw. 

The result of a die roll is determined by the way it is thrown, according to the laws of classical mechanics. A die roll is made random by uncertainty in minor factors such as tiny movements in the thrower's hand; they are thus a crude form of hardware random number generator. 

One typical contemporary dice game is craps, where two dice are thrown simultaneously and wagers are made on the total value of the two dice. Dice are frequently used to introduce randomness into board games, where they are often used to decide the distance through which a piece will move along the board (as in backgammon and Monopoly).

Construction

Arrangement

(While the use of Arabic numerals is occasionally seen, such dice are less common.)

Opposite sides of a modern die traditionally add up to seven, requiring the 1, 2, and 3 faces to share a vertex. The faces of a die may be placed clockwise or counterclockwise about this vertex. If the 1, 2, and 3 faces run counterclockwise, the die is called "right-handed". If those faces run clockwise, the die is called "left-handed". Western dice are normally right-handed, and Chinese dice are normally left-handed.

The pips on standard six-sided dice are arranged in specific patterns as shown. Asian style dice bear similar patterns to Western ones, but the pips are closer to the center of the face; in addition, the pips are differently sized on Asian style dice, and the pips are colored red on the 1 and 4 sides. Red fours may be of Indian origin.

Manufacturing

Non-precision dice are manufactured via the plastic injection molding process, often made of polymethyl methacrylate (PMMA). The pips or numbers on the die are a part of the mold. Different pigments can be added to the dice to make them opaque or transparent, or multiple pigments may be added to make the dice speckled or marbled.

The coloring for numbering is achieved by submerging the die entirely in paint, which is allowed to dry. The die is then polished via a tumble finishing process similar to rock polishing. The abrasive agent scrapes off all of the paint except for the indents of the numbering. A finer abrasive is then used to polish the die. This process also produces the smoother, rounded edges on the dice.

Precision casino dice may have a polished or sand finish, making them transparent or translucent respectively. Casino dice have their pips drilled, then filled flush with a paint of the same density as the material used for the dice, such that the center of gravity of the dice is as close to the geometric center as possible. This mitigates concerns that the pips will cause a small bias. All such dice are stamped with a serial number to prevent potential cheaters from substituting a die. Precision backgammon dice are made the same way; they tend to be slightly smaller and have rounded corners and edges, to allow better movement inside the dice cup and stop forceful rolls from damaging the playing surface.

Etymology and terms
The word die comes from Old French dé; from Latin datum "something which is given or played".

While the terms ace, deuce, trey, cater, cinque and sice are generally obsolete, with the names of the numbers preferred, they are still used by some professional gamblers to designate different sides of the dice. Ace is from the Latin as, meaning "a unit"; the others are 2 to 6 in Old French.

When rolling two dice, certain combinations have slang names. The term snake eyes is a roll of one pip on each die. The Online Etymology Dictionary traces use of the term as far back as 1919.
The US term boxcars, also known as midnight, is a roll of six pips on each die. The pair of six pips resembles a pair of boxcars on a freight train. Many rolls have names in the game of craps.

Unicode representation
⚀ ⚁ ⚂ ⚃ ⚄ ⚅

Using Unicode characters, the faces can be shown in text using the range U+2680 to U+2685 or using decimal &#9856; to &#9861;.

Loaded dice
A loaded, weighted, cheat, or crooked die is one that has been tampered with so that it will land with a specific side facing upwards more or less often than a fair die would. There are several methods for making loaded dice, including rounded faces, off-square faces, and weights. Casinos and gambling halls frequently use transparent cellulose acetate dice as tampering is easier to detect than with opaque dice.

Variants

Polyhedral dice

Various shapes like two-sided or four-sided dice are documented in archaeological findings; for example, from Ancient Egypt and the Middle East. While the cubical six-sided die became the most common type in many parts of the world, other shapes were always known, like 20-sided dice in Ptolemaic and Roman times. 

The modern tradition of using sets of polyhedral dice started around the end of the 1960s when non-cubical dice became popular among players of wargames, and since have been employed extensively in role-playing games and trading card games. Dice using both the numerals 6 and 9, which are reciprocally symmetric through rotation, typically distinguish them with a dot or underline.

Common variations

Dice are often sold in sets, matching in color, of six different shapes. Five of the dice are shaped like the Platonic solids, whose faces are regular polygons. Aside from the cube, the other four Platonic solids have 4, 8, 12, and 20 faces, allowing for those number ranges to be generated. The only other common non-cubical die is the 10-sided die, a pentagonal trapezohedron die, whose faces are ten kites, each with two different edge lengths, three different angles, and two different kinds of vertices. Such sets frequently include a second 10-sided die either of contrasting color or numbered by tens, allowing the pair of 10-sided dice to be combined to generate numbers between 1 and 100.

Using these dice in various ways, games can closely approximate a variety of probability distributions. For instance, 10-sided dice can be rolled in pairs to produce a uniform distribution of random percentages, and summing the values of multiple dice will produce approximations to normal distributions. 

Unlike other common dice, a four-sided (tetrahedral) die does not have a side that faces upward when it is at rest on a surface, so it must be read in a different way. On some four-sided dice, each face features multiple numbers, with the same number printed near each vertex on all sides. In this case, the number around the vertex pointing up is used. Alternatively, the numbers on a tetrahedral die can be placed at the middles of the edges, in which case the numbers around the base are used.

Normally, the faces on a die will be placed so opposite faces will add up to one more than the number of faces. (This is not possible with 4-sided dice and dice with an odd-number of faces.) Some dice, such as those with 10 sides, are usually numbered sequentially beginning with 0, in which case the opposite faces will add to one less than the number of faces.

Some twenty-sided dice have a different arrangement used for the purpose of keeping track of an integer that counts down, such as health points. These spindown dice are arranged such that adjacent integers appear on adjacent faces, allowing the user to easily find the next lower number. They are commonly used with collectible card games.

Rarer variations

"Uniform fair dice" are dice where all faces have equal probability of outcome due to the symmetry of the die as it is face-transitive. In addition to the Platonic solids, these theoretically include:

 Catalan solids, the duals of the 13 Archimedean solids: 12, 24, 30, 48, 60, 120 sides
 Trapezohedra, the duals of the infinite set of antiprisms, with kite faces: any even number not divisible by 4 (so that a face will face up), starting from 6
 Bipyramids, the duals of the infinite set of prisms, with triangle faces: any multiple of 4 (so that a face will face up), starting from 8
 Disphenoids, an infinite set of tetrahedra made from congruent non-regular triangles: 4 sides. This is a less symmetric tetrahedron than the Platonic tetrahedron, but still sufficiently symmetrical to be face-transitive. Similarly, pyritohedra and tetartoids are less symmetrical but still face-transitive dodecahedra: 12 sides.

Two other types of polyhedra are technically not face-transitive, but are still fair dice due to symmetry:

 antiprisms: the basis of barrel dice
 prisms: the basis of long dice and teetotums

Long dice and teetotums can in principle be made with any number of faces, including odd numbers. Long dice are based on the infinite set of prisms. All the rectangular faces are mutually face-transitive, so they are equally probable. The two ends of the prism may be rounded or capped with a pyramid, designed so that the die cannot rest on those faces. 4-sided long dice are easier to roll than tetrahedra, and are used in the traditional board games dayakattai and daldøs.

Non-numeric dice

The faces of most dice are labelled using sequences of whole numbers, usually starting at one, expressed with either pips or digits. However, there are some applications that require results other than numbers. Examples include letters for Boggle, directions for Warhammer Fantasy Battle, Fudge dice, playing card symbols for poker dice, and instructions for sexual acts using sex dice.

Alternatively-numbered dice
Dice may have numbers that do not form a counting sequence starting at one. One variation on the standard die is known as the "average" die. These are six-sided dice with sides numbered 2, 3, 3, 4, 4, 5, which have the same arithmetic mean as a standard die (3.5 for a single die, 7 for a pair of dice), but have a narrower range of possible values (2 through 5 for one, 4 through 10 for a pair). They are used in some table-top wargames, where a narrower range of numbers is required. Other numbered variations include Sicherman dice and intransitive dice.

Spherical dice

A die can be constructed in the shape of a sphere, with the addition of an internal cavity in the shape of the dual polyhedron of the desired die shape and an internal weight. The weight will settle in one of the points of the internal cavity, causing it to settle with one of the numbers uppermost. For instance, a sphere with an octahedral cavity and a small internal weight will settle with one of the 6 points of the cavity held downwards by the weight.

Applications

Many board games use dice to randomize how far pieces move or to settle conflicts. Typically, this has meant that rolling higher numbers is better. Some games, such as Axis & Allies, have inverted this system by making the lower values more potent. In the modern age, a few games and game designers have approached dice in a different way by making each side of the die similarly valuable. In Castles of Burgundy, players spend their dice to take actions based on the die's value. In this game, a six is not better than a one, or vice versa. In Quarriors (and its descendant, Dicemasters), different sides of the dice can offer completely different abilities. Several sides often give resources while others grant the player useful actions.

Dice can be used for divination and using dice for such a purpose is called cleromancy. A pair of common dice is usual, though other forms of polyhedra can be used. Tibetan Buddhists sometimes use this method of divination. It is highly likely that the Pythagoreans used the Platonic solids as dice. They referred to such dice as "the dice of the gods" and they sought to understand the universe through an understanding of geometry in polyhedra.

Polyhedral dice are commonly used in role-playing games. The fantasy role-playing game Dungeons & Dragons (D&D) is largely credited with popularizing dice in such games. Some games use only one type, like Exalted which uses only ten-sided dice. Others use numerous types for different game purposes, such as D&D, which makes use of all common polyhedral dice. Dice are usually used to determine the outcome of events. Games typically determine results either as a total on one or more dice above or below a fixed number, or a certain number of rolls above a certain number on one or more dice. Due to circumstances or character skill, the initial roll may have a number added to or subtracted from the final result, or have the player roll extra or fewer dice. To keep track of rolls easily, dice notation is frequently used.

Astrological dice are a specialized set of three 12-sided dice for divination; the first die represents the planets, the Sun, the Moon, and the nodes of the Moon, the second die represents the 12 zodiac signs, and the third represents the 12 houses. A specialized icosahedron die provides the answers of the Magic 8 Ball, conventionally used to provide answers to yes-or-no questions.

Dice can be used to generate random numbers for use in passwords and cryptography applications. The Electronic Frontier Foundation describes a method by which dice can be used to generate passphrases. Diceware is a method recommended for generating secure but memorable passphrases, by repeatedly rolling five dice and picking the corresponding word from a pre-generated list.

Notation

In many gaming contexts, especially tabletop role-playing games, shorthand notations representing different dice rolls are used. A "d" or "D" is used to indicate a die with a specific number of sides; for example,d4denotes a four-sided die. If several dice of the same type are to be rolled, this is indicated by a leading number specifying the number of dice. Hence,6d8 means the player should roll six eight-sided dice and add the results. Modifiers to a die roll can also be indicated as desired. For example, 3d6+4 instructs the player to roll three six-sided dice, calculate the total, and add four to it.

See also

 Astragalomancy
 Crown and Anchor
 d20 System
 Dreidel
 Fuzzy dice
 Musikalisches Würfelspiel

 Die throw (review)
 Intransitive dice
 Quincunx
 Teetotum
 Urim and Thummim

References

Bibliography
 Diaconis, Persi; and Keller, Joseph B.; "Fair Dice", The American Mathematical Monthly, 96(4):337–339, 1989 (Discussion of dice that are fair "by symmetry" and "by continuity".)
 Iverson, G. R.; Longcour, W. H.; et al.; Bias and Runs in Dice Throwing and Recording: A Few Million Throws, Psychometrika, vol. 36, no. 1, March 1971
 Knizia, Reiner, Dice Games Properly Explained, Elliot Right Way Books, 1999,

External links

  analysis of dice probabilities, also featuring Uspenski's work on rolling multiple dice

 
 
Gaming devices